The Mesić Monastery (Romanian: Manastirea Mesici) is a Serb Orthodox monastery situated in the Banat region, in the province of Vojvodina, Serbia. The monastery is situated near the village of Mesić, in the Vršac municipality. It was founded in the 15th century, although legend holds that it was built in 1225 by Arsenije Bogdanović of the Hilandar.

Mesić Monastery was declared Monument of Culture of Exceptional Importance in 1990, and it is protected by Serbia.

See also
Tourism in Serbia
List of Serb Orthodox monasteries

External links 

More about the monastery

Serbian Orthodox monasteries in Vojvodina
Banat
Vršac
1225 establishments in Europe
Christian monasteries established in the 15th century
Cultural Monuments of Exceptional Importance (Serbia)
Medieval sites in Serbia
Medieval Serbian Orthodox monasteries
15th-century establishments in Serbia

eo:Mesicj